Peter Guthrie (born 1968/1969) is a Canadian politician elected in the 2019 Alberta general election to represent the electoral district of Airdrie-Cochrane in the 30th Alberta Legislature. Peter Guthrie was born in Brockville, Ont., while he lived out most of his life in Alberta. Guthrie has owned two businesses – Dumaresq Brothers Ranch in Consort, Alta., and a Mr. Lube franchise in Calgary.

References

United Conservative Party MLAs
Living people
Members of the Executive Council of Alberta
21st-century Canadian politicians
1960s births
Year of birth uncertain